Gisburne Park is an 18th-century country house and associated park in Gisburn, Lancashire, England, in the Ribble Valley some  north-east of Clitheroe.  The house is a Grade I listed building, and is now used as a hospital. The associated 1,000 acre park is Grade II listed, and is now an equestrian centre and holiday park.

History
The Manor of Gisburne was first acquired by the Lister family in 1614 but the family only moved from Arnoldsbiggin to Lower Hall, Gisburne in 1706. The present hall was built between 1727 and 1736 by Thomas Lister with two storeys to an H-shaped floor plan, the south frontage having nine bays, the central three recessed, all pebbledashed with sandstone dressings and hipped slate roof. Lister was the Member of Parliament for Clitheroe from 1713 to his death in 1745. He was reputed to have planted over a million oak trees in this stretch of the Ribble Valley and in the surrounding parkland kept a herd of semi-wild white cattle which died out in 1859. The estate then passed from father to son through Thomas (1723–1761), also MP for Clitheroe from 1745 to 1761, to Thomas (1752-1826), MP for Clitheroe from 1773 to 1790 who in 1797 was created Baron Ribblesdale. He was followed in turn by Thomas, the second Baron Ribblesdale, then Thomas, the third Baron and finally Thomas Lister, 4th Baron Ribblesdale.

On the fourth baron's death in 1925 part of the estate had to be sold to cover death duties. He had two sons, both of whom had been killed in action, one in the Boer War and the other in the first World War and he was survived only by his two sisters. On their deaths in 1944, the remaining estate was sold to the Hindley family, one of the founders of the British Home Stores.

In October 1985, Gisburne Park house was converted and extended to become an independent private hospital and rehabilitation centre, with Christopher Hindley being its chairman and later its executive director. In 1995 the house and adjacent land was sold and became the BMI Gisburne Park Hospital.

The park 

The 1,000-acre park, owned since 2003 by Guy Hindley and his American actress wife Amber Mead, is home to an equestrian centre and the Ribblesdale Holiday Park (developed around the old Deer House Farm and dairy). The Pennine Bridleway passes through the park, and at the south end of the park, the Ribble Valley line passes under the park in a cut-and-cover tunnel.

See also

Grade I listed buildings in Lancashire
Listed buildings in Gisburn

References

External links
 

Country houses in Lancashire
Grade I listed buildings in Lancashire
Hospitals in Lancashire
Buildings and structures in Ribble Valley
Grade II listed parks and gardens in Lancashire